Aq Kandi may refer to:
 Aq Kandi, East Azerbaijan
 Aq Kandi, Zanjan